Events in the year 2019 in the Northern Mariana Islands.

Incumbents
President: Donald Trump
Governor: Ralph Torres

Events

Deaths

6 January – Francisco Dela Cruz, politician, member of the House of Representatives (b. 1962).

References

 
2010s in the Northern Mariana Islands
Years of the 21st century in the Northern Mariana Islands
Northern Mariana Islands
Northern Mariana Islands